Easy Star's Lonely Hearts Dub Band is a dub reggae tribute to the Beatles' album Sgt. Pepper's Lonely Hearts Club Band, by the Easy Star All-Stars. It was released on April 14, 2009.

Track listing
"Sgt. Pepper's Lonely Hearts Club Band" ft. Junior Jazz
"With a Little Help from My Friends" ft. Luciano
"Lucy in the Sky with Diamonds" ft. Frankie Paul
"Getting Better" ft. The Mighty Diamonds
"Fixing a Hole (Extended Dub Mix)" ft. Max Romeo
"She's Leaving Home" ft. Kirsty Rock
"Being for the Benefit of Mr. Kite!" ft. Ranking Roger
"Within You Without You" ft. Matisyahu
"When I'm Sixty-Four (Extended Dub Mix)" ft. Sugar Minott
"Lovely Rita" ft. Bunny Rugs & U-Roy
"Good Morning Good Morning" ft. Steel Pulse
"Sgt. Pepper's Lonely Hearts Club Band (Reprise)" ft. Junior Jazz
"A Day in the Life" ft. Michael Rose and Menny More
Bonus tracks
"With a Little Dub from My Friends" ft. Luciano and U Roy
"Kaleidoscope Dub"

See also
 Sgt. Pepper's (Big Daddy album)
 With a Little Help from My Fwends

References

External links
 Easy Star Records

2009 albums
The Beatles tribute albums
Easy Star All-Stars albums
Easy Star Records albums
Albums produced by Michael Goldwasser